The Habit Burger Grill is an American fast casual restaurant chain that specializes in chargrilled hamburgers. The company also sells other typical fast-casual fare. Its headquarters are in Irvine, California.

In March 2020, Yum! Brands, the parent company of KFC, Pizza Hut, Taco Bell and Wingstreet, acquired The Habit Burger Grill.

History
The Habit Burger Grill was founded on November 15, 1969, in Santa Barbara County, California as a family-owned business.

In 1980, Brent and Bruce Reichard purchased the original location in Goleta. A second location opened in Ventura in 1996 and they gradually grew the chain to twenty-four units in Southern California.

In 2007, KarpReilly, a private equity firm, acquired a majority ownership in the company and began to rapidly expand the chain, including franchising. Not included in the sale were the eight locations in Santa Barbara County, California, which remained under the ownership of the Reichard brothers.

In 2014, Habit had 109 locations either open for business or under construction, including an expansion into Seattle.  At that time, the company was one of the fastest-growing fast food chains in the United States, with a 40% sales increase from 2012 to 2013. In November 2014, the company raised $83.7 million in an initial public offering.   The share price immediately doubled. By 2016, growth had slowed significantly, in line with the burger business.

In 2017, the company announced plans to expand into the United Kingdom with 30 restaurants.

In March 2020, Yum! Brands, the parent company of Taco Bell and KFC, acquired Habit. The brothers decided to retire and sell their remaining restaurants to Yum! Brands in 2020. The operations shifted in March 2022.

History Timeline

1969-The Original Hamburger Habit opens in Goleta, California. It is still The Habit today.

1996-The 2nd Hamburger Habit opens in downtown Ventura. 

1997-A 3rd Hamburger Habit opens in Santa Barbara. Later in the year, it is renamed The Habit Burger Grill, due to the original name already claimed by a burger spot in West Los Angeles called the Hamburger Habit. 

1998- The 4th Habit opens on the east side of Ventura.

1999- The 5th Habit opens in Oxnard.

2000-The 6th Habit opens in Camarillo.

2001-Six family-owned Habits maintain steady business in Ventura County.

2002-A downtown Santa Barbara location opens in the wing of the Metropolitan Theatre. Another one opens in Newberry Park. The Habit expands into Los Angeles County with locations in Woodland Hills and Santa Clarita. The year ends with 10 Habits.

2003-Two locations open in Glendale and Encino. During the year, the Logo is redesigned to the current one. 12 Habits.

2004-Another location opens in Simi Valley. 13 Habits. 

2005-Another location opens in Thousand Oaks. The Habit expands into Northern California with two more locations in the Sacramento area and Elk Grove. 16 Habits.

2006-Two more locations open in Valencia and Roseville. 18 Habits (including 3 in the Sacramento area)

2007-Six more locations open, including a short lived one in Davis, that would close by the end of 2011. The other four locations include Sacramento, Sherman Oaks, Torrance, Chatsworth, and one more in Santa Barbara. The year ends with 24 Habits. 

2008-Big changes. No new locations

2009-4 new locations, including 1st new location in Orange County in Santa Ana. The others are Santa Clarita, El Segundo, and La Verne. The El Segundo location opens in the former Grand Café Bar & Grill. The year ends with 28 Habits.

2010-A Kentucky Fried Chicken is replaced by The Habit in Reseda. 2nd Habit in Orange County opens in Fullerton. 1st Habit in Central California opens in Fresno. Another one opens in Agoura Hills. A former Johnny Rockets in Lake Forest is converted to The Habit. 33 Habits.

2011-Was a year of HUGE expansion. 19 new locations. Citrus Heights (former Camille Restaurant). Walnut Creek, 1st in Bay Area. Two other open in the Bay Area in San Mateo and Pleasanton. 2nd Central California opens in Visalia in former restored Mearle’s College Drive-In. 1st 
Central coast location San Luis Obispo. Pasadena (former Boston Market). West Covina and Norwalk locations open. Anaheim (former Pizza Hut) and Aliso Viejo. 1st one in San Bernardino County opens in Chino Hills. Two in San Diego open and North Hollywood. Burbank opens in former Hollywood Video. The Habit expands into Arizona with three locations in Phoenix, Tempe, and the former old 5 & Diner in Chandler. 52 Habits at the end of 2011.

2012-17 new locations. 16 of these open in California, and they include Costa Mesa, Folsom (former Japanese sushi place), Huntington Beach (former Tommie’s Pastrami), Irvine (on top of a Burger King), Isla Vista (former Mexican restaurant), La Canada Flintridge, Murrieta, Napa, Rancho Cordova, Rosemead (former Hollywood Video), San Clemente (former Carls Jr), Simi Valley (newer shopping center that replaced a Kmart), Solana Beach, Sunnyvale (former Daphne’s Greek Café), Walnut Creek 2nd location, and Whittier (former Samuel’s Jewelry).  Another Habit opens in Phoenix in a former Florist Shop where the old building marque was preserved. 69 Habits at the end of the year. 

2013-22 new locations. A record year of growth. The Habit expands into Utah with three locations in Farmington, St. George, and Salt Lake City. Salt Lake City hosts the 1st Habit built in Utah on top of an old historic business row including the Granite Furniture Bldg. Two locations in Arizona open in Scottsdale and Phoenix on top of an old Marie Callendars. 16 new California locations include Azusa (former Kellys’ Coffee), Buena Park, Clovis, Eastvale, Fremont, 2nd Irvine location (former Burger King), Long Beach, Novato (former Phyllis Giant Burgers), the brand-new Graton Resort & Casino in Rohnert Park, Redding, San Diego near Sports Arena, San Marcos (former Mexican Restaurant), San Ramon (former Blockbuster Video), Stockton, Temecula, Vallejo (former Wendys), and Van Nuys (former Hollywood Video). 91 Habits at the end of the year.

2014-Another 22 new locations. The first Habit on the East Coast opens in Fairlawn, New Jersey. 3 more open in Utah, in Sandy, South Jordan, and Layton (former Goodyear Tire Shop). 22 units open in California, including the first two university campus locations at San Diego State University, and USC Los Angeles. Other new California locations include Antioch (former antique store), Dublin (old Circuit City sign), Napa (on top of Ford Dealership), Petaluma, San Leandro (site of bulldozed Albertsons), Santa Clara, Downey, Los Angeles on Figueroa St, La Quinta, San Dimas, Upland, Cypress, Carlsbad, Oceanside, and San Diego on Genesee Ave. A large part of historic business row in South Gate is bulldozed to make room for a new shopping center with a new Habit. 113 Habits at the end of the year. 

2015-Record breaking growth of 33 new locations. These include expansions into Washington, Nevada, Idaho, Florida, Maryland, and Virginia. 1st location in Nevada opens in Las Vegas on bulldozed Cozymels Coastal Mexican Grill. 1st location in Idaho opens in Meridian. 1st location in Washington opens in Kent. 1st location in Virginia opens in Ashburn. 1st location in Maryland opens in Rockville on top of bulldozed Ted’s 355 50s style diner. Two locations in Florida open in Del Rey Beach and Miami. Two more NJ locations open in Eatontown and River Edge. Three locations in Utah open in American Fork, West Jordon, and Cottonwood Heights (former Café Rio). 21 California locations open in Alameda (on top of portions of former Alameda Naval Air Station), Alhambra (bulldozed business row), Bakersfield, Cerritos (bulldozed Spoons California Grill), Concord (bulldozed coffee shop), Daly City, Dublin 2nd location, Fresno 2nd location, Gilroy, Hanford, Hesperia, Modesto, Orange, Palmdale, Pico Rivera (former AT&T store), Redlands, Redwood City (former Johnny Rockets), Riverside Plaza in Riverside, 2nd Riverside location where Target sign was, Upland 2nd location, and Vacaville. 146 Habits at end of the year. 

2016-28 new locations. The Habit opens its first two international locations inside the Battuta Mall in Dubai and another mall in Sharjah Mall in United Arab Emirates. The first two locations to close would be the Davis and Sherman Oaks, California locations at the end of the year. Three new Arizona locations open in Avondale, Gilbert, and Grand Canyon University in Phoenix. Two new New Jersey locations open in Teterboro and Parsipanny (former Lucky Star Chinese Restaurant). Two new Florida locations in Palm Beach Gardens and Royal Palm Beach. Another Washington location opens in Tukwilla. Two new Nevada locations in Las Vegas and Henderson (former Ulta Beauty). In California, the century old Tejon Ranch attempted to build a master city called Centennial, and this included opening another Habit in a giant food row location off Interstate 5. The other California locations that opened included the 2nd Bakersfield unit, Campbell (bulldozed Thai Pepper Cuisine Restaurant), Dana Point (former Burger King), Irvine 3rd location, LAX Airport terminal, La Mesa, Livermore (former Citibank), Lompoc, Menifee, Montebello, Oakland, Palm Desert (bulldozed Dennys/KFC), Rolling Hills Estates (bulldozed RV Bicycle Center), Rowland Heights (former Barnes & Nobles), and San Jose. 172 Habits at the end of year. 

2017-46 new locations. The Habit opens its first location in China. It is in the Fuxing Plaza in Shanghai. The first Habit in Pennsylvania opens in the King of Prussia. A location opens in Cherry Hill, New Jersey on bulldozed medical retail space. Another Maryland locations opens in Waldorf. 5 locations open in Florida, including 3 in Central Florida. They include 2 in Orlando, one in Winter Park, Pembroke Pines, and Plantation. 2 locations open in Washington in Shoreline and on the bulldozed Round Table Pizza in Tacoma. Another Utah location opens in Riverdale on the bulldozed Freeway Auto Dealership. Two new locations in Las Vegas open in the Fashion Show Mall, and a former Euphoria. 1st location in Northern Nevada opens in Reno in the Circus Circus Casino. Two Arizona locations include a converted Carls Jr in Flagstaff and a bulldozed Circle K in Glendale. California gets 29 new locations. Mission Hills (Heavily remodeled section of 60s era shopping plaza of what was near a Ralphs Supermarket), Mira Mesa (former site of gas station), Bakersfield 3rd location, Encinitas (Site of former 7-Eleven), Escondido (Razed historic Wagon Wheel Restaurant & Palm Tree Lodge), Wildomar, Paramount (bulldozed Rosewood Restaurant), University of Riverside, Rancho Cucamonga (demolished China Buffett), Barstow (Site of old coffee shop built 1967 that had recently been a Bobs Big Boy), Fullerton (Demolished El Torito), La Mirada (former Starbucks), Inglewood (bulldozed Dulan’s Soul Food Kitchen), Los Angeles Sunset Blvd (former Lucy’s Laundry Mart & Starbucks/Subway), Westlake Village (former Daves BBQ and Applebees before), Buellton, Santa Maria, Fresno on Blackstone, Los Banos, San Jose in new shopping center on Brokaw Rd, Santa Cruz (bulldozed Starving Musician Store), Turlock, San Jose on Monterey Rd, Cupertino (former Noodles & Company and Baja Fresh before), Albany, Pinole, Antioch 2nd location (bulldozed Carrows), Foster city (bulldozed Harry’s Hofbrau Restaurant), and 2nd location in Sacramento. 218 Habits at the end of the year.
 
2018-35 new locations. Three more Habit locations open in malls in Shanghai, China. 17 new locations in California. They include Moreno Valley, California Baptist University in Riverside, Rialto, Victorville, Mission Viejo (bulldozed CoCos Restaurant), Fountain Valley, Duarte (former Starbucks), Gardena, Lancaster (former used car sales lot), Port Hueneme (former Blockbuster Video), San City (former Burger King), Manteca, Tracy, Lodi, Castro Valley, Fairfield, and Dixon (bulldozed Arbys). 2 Arizona locations open in Tucson. Another Vegas location opens in former Party Superstore and one opens in North Las Vegas. Another Utah location opens in Provo. Two Idaho Drive-Thru locations open in Twin Falls and Nampa. In Washington, a unit opens in Issaquah, and 2 in Seattle. They include a bulldozed Seattle Housing Authority Bldg and a former KFC. Another Virginia location opens in Chantilly. Two New Jersey locations open in Bridgewater and Montvale. In Maryland, one opens in Riverdale Park and another in Gaithersburg (bulldozed Ismet’s Market). The year ends with 253 locations. 

2019-29 new locations. All three Central Florida locations closed. Three more locations opened in malls in Shanghai, China. All two locations in the Dubai area of United Arab Emirates closed. The Habit expanded into North Carolina, with locations in Charlotte, Fayetteville, and Clemmons. The 1st South Carolina location opens in Indian Land. A New Jersey location opens in Florham. A Virginia location opens in Richmond. In Florida, a 2nd location opens in Palm Beach Gardens. The 2nd Northern Nevada location opens in Sparks. In Phoenix, a location opens in Sky Harbor Int’l Airport. In California, 17 locations open. They include El Centro, Westminster (bulldozed IHOP), Anaheim on Katella, Diamond Bar, Los Angeles Century Blvd (new shopping center that replaced a large industrial area), Los Angeles Hope St (opens in 34 story apartment bldg), Santa Monica, Thousand Oaks in Cal Lutheran University, Atascadero (bulldozed CoCos), Porterville, Tulare (bulldozed Long John Silvers), Selma, Santa Clara (bulldozed 5 story office bldg.), Santa Rosa (bulldozed Arbys), Rocklin, and Yuba City (bulldozed office row/Shell Gas). The year ends with 277 units. 

2020-17 new locations. A slower year of growth due to COVID. Nine new locations open in California. They include Sylmar (Bulldozed old Casa Torres Restaurant), Hemet (bulldozed CoCos), Colton, Bell Gardens (former Chipotle), Salinas (former mattress store), South Pasadena, Hermosa Beach (former Hermosa Beach Fish & Shop Restaurant), Bakersfield Ashe Rd, Woodland (former Del Taco), and Sacramento Freeport Blvd (bulldozed complex of greenhouses, sheds). In Arizona, The Habit replaces the bulldozed Classic Burger in Lake Havasu City. In Nevada, a Habit opens in the University of Nevada-Reno. In Washington, one opens in Bonney Lake. In New Jersey, in city of Union, some university buildings are replaced with a new shopping center with a Habit. The first Massachusetts location opens in Wilmington. One more opens in Shanghai, China. Towards the end of the year, the 1st Habit in Cambodia opens in Phnom Penh. The year ends with 294 units.
 
2021-31 new locations. Growth begins to pick up after the worst of the COVID. The sole location in Charlotte, North Carolina closes. The Chandler Arizona location closes. 18 locations open in California. They include Porter Ranch, Canoga Park (opens in former Stars Diner), Compton (former Check cashing), Universal City (Universal Studios), Poway, Vista, Corona (2 locations), Ontario (site of former Radio Shack), Tustin (former Arbys), Santa Ana (former Coffee Bean), La Habra (former Burger King), El Monte, Fresno on Brawley Ave, Atwater, Ceres, Sonora (former KFC), Union City (last Fuddruckers to close in California), and Sacramento Capitol Ave (former A&W Root Beer/KFC). Two Arizona locations open in Tempe (former PDQ Chicken Restaurant) and Phoenix on Indian School Rd. Another Las Vegas location opens in a former KFC on Rancho Drive. Another Utah location in Ogden opens in the former La Puente Mexican Restaurant. 2 locations open in Washington in Richland (site of former USA Gas) and Yakima (former parking lot of bulldozed Montgomery Ward). In Maryland, a location opens in Towson in former site of bulldozed Baltimore County Highways Towson Shop 5. A New Jersey location opens in Wayne. Three more locations open in Phnom Penh, Cambodia. The year ends with 323 locations. 

2022-29 new locations. 2 more locations open in Cambodia. Three locations close in Shanghai, China. In California, 19 new locations open in Lake View Terrace (former Fatburger), El Cajon (former Burger King), Granada Hills (former Burrito place), Watsonville San Diego Grand Ave (former Mexican food), Palm Desert, San Jacinto, San Bernardino Cal State Univ, Seal Beach, Garden Grove, Baldwin Park (former Taco Ready), Merced, Millbrae (former Café Roma), San Rafael (site of former Goodyear Tire), Placerville, Marysville (former Burger King), Chico (bulldozed Peter Chu’s Mandarin Cuisine/Video Store), Long Beach Pacific Coast Hwy (former Burger King). In Arizona, 3 locations open at Phoenix Thunderbird Lane, Phoenix Bell Rd (former Burger King), and Mesa (site of former Circle K Gas/Food Mart). In Utah, a location opens in Logan. In Washington, a location opens in Sammamish (former Jack-in-the-Box). In North Carolina, a location opens in Burlington (site of former Sears Auto Center). In New Jersey, a 2nd location opens in Union. In Washington, a location opens in Puyallup. The year ends with 350 locations. 

2023-As of March, 8 locations so far for 2023. Mountain View, CA (former Sweet Tomatoes), Oakland, CA (former Boston Market), 2ND Ontario, CA location drive-thru, 2nd Roseville, California location, 2nd Mesa, AZ location, Laveen, AZ, Monroe, NC, and East Brunswick, NJ.

Locations
As of March 2023, Habit Burger Grill currently has 358 locations, mostly in California, as follows:

The company also has a fleet of nine food trucks.

Reception
In mid-2014, The Habit's "Charburger" was named the best burger in America by Consumer Reports, a nonprofit organization dedicated to unbiased product testing, scoring an 8.1 out of 10 among 53,745 participants.

See also
 List of hamburger restaurants

References

External links
 

Yum! Brands
1969 establishments in California
Companies based in Irvine, California
Companies formerly listed on the Nasdaq
Cuisine of the Western United States
Restaurants established in 1969
2007 mergers and acquisitions
2020 mergers and acquisitions
Economy of the Southwestern United States
Fast-food chains of the United States
Fast-food franchises
Fast-food hamburger restaurants
Regional restaurant chains in the United States
Restaurants in California
2014 initial public offerings